Pinus edulis, the Colorado pinyon, two-needle piñon, pinyon pine, or simply piñon, is a pine in the pinyon pine group whose ancestor was a member of the Madro-Tertiary Geoflora (a group of drought resistant trees) and is native to the United States.

Distribution and habitat
The range in the U.S. is in Colorado, southern Wyoming, eastern and central Utah, northern Arizona, New Mexico, western Oklahoma, southeastern California, and the Guadalupe Mountains in far western Texas, as well as northern Mexico. It is widespread and often abundant in this region, forming extensive open woodlands, usually mixed with junipers in the pinyon-juniper woodland plant community. The Colorado pinyon (piñon) grows as the dominant species on 4.8 million acres in Colorado, making up 22% of the state's forests. The Colorado pinyon has cultural meaning to agriculture, as strong piñon wood "plow heads" were used to break soil for crop planting at the state's earliest known agricultural settlements.

Description
Its growth is "at an almost inconceivably slow rate" growing only six feet (1.8 meters) in one hundred years under good conditions.  for an average growth of 0.72 inch (18 millimeters)per year. The bark is irregularly furrowed and scaly.

The cones open to  broad when mature, holding the seeds on the scales after opening.

The species intermixes with Pinus monophylla sbsp. fallax (see description under Pinus monophylla) for several hundred kilometers along the Mogollon Rim of central Arizona and the Grand Canyon resulting in trees with both single- and two-needled fascicles on each branch.  The frequency of two-needled fascicles increases following wet years and decreases following dry years.  The internal anatomy of both these needle types are identical except for the number of needles in each fascicle suggesting that Little's 1968 designation  of this tree as a variety of Pinus edulis is more likely than its subsequent designation as a subspecies of Pinus monophylla based entirely upon its single needle fascicle.

It is an aromatic species. Essential oil can be extracted from the trunk, limbs, needles, and seed cones. Prominent aromatic compounds from each portion of the tree include α-pinene, sabinene, β-pinene, δ-3-carene, β-phellandrene, ethyl octanoate, longifolene, and germacrene D.

Ecology
The seeds are dispersed by the pinyon jay, which plucks them out of the open cones. The jay, which uses the seeds as a food resource, stores many of the seeds for later use, and some of these stored seeds are not used and are able to grow into new trees. The seeds are also eaten by wild turkey, Montezuma quail, and various mammals.

History

Colorado pinyon was described by George Engelmann in 1848 from collections made near Santa Fe, New Mexico on Alexander William Doniphan's expedition to northern Mexico in 1846.

It is most closely related to the single-leaf pinyon, which hybridises with it occasionally where their ranges meet in western Arizona and Utah. It is also closely related to the Texas pinyon, but is separated from it by a gap of about  so does not hybridise with it.

An isolated population of trees in the New York Mountains of southeast California, previously thought to be Colorado pinyons, have recently been shown to be a two-needled variant of single-leaf pinyon from chemical and genetic evidence. Occasional two-needled pinyons in northern Baja California, Mexico have sometimes been referred to Colorado pinyon in the past, but are now known to be hybrids between single-leaf pinyon and Parry pinyon.

Uses

The edible seeds, pine nuts, are extensively collected throughout its range; in many areas, the seed harvest rights are owned by Native American tribes, for whom the species is of immense cultural and economic importance. They can be stored for a year when unshelled. 

Archaeologist Harold S. Gladwin described pit-houses constructed by southwestern Native Americans  400–900 CE; these were fortified with posts made from Pinyon trunks and coated with mud.

Colorado pinyon is also occasionally planted as an ornamental tree and sometimes used as a Christmas tree.

The piñon pine (Pinus edulis) is the state tree of New Mexico.

See also
Habitat fragmentation

References

Ronald M. Lanner, 1981. The Piñon Pine: A Natural and Cultural History. University of Nevada Press. .

External links

Gymnosperm Database: Pinus edulis

edulis
Trees of the Western United States
Flora of Arizona
Flora of Colorado
Flora of New Mexico
Flora of Utah
Flora of Wyoming
Trees of the Southwestern United States
Trees of the South-Central United States
Trees of the Great Basin
Flora of the Southwestern United States
Flora of the Colorado Plateau and Canyonlands region
Natural history of the Grand Canyon
Edible nuts and seeds
Symbols of New Mexico
Least concern flora of North America
Least concern flora of the United States
Taxa named by George Engelmann